Cynthia Lynn Daniel (married name: Cynthia Hauser) is an American photographer and actress. She is the twin sister of actress Brittany Daniel and is best known for her role as Elizabeth Wakefield in the 1990s syndicated teen drama Sweet Valley High.

Early life
Born in Gainesville, Florida, Cynthia is five minutes younger than her twin sister, Brittany. They have an older brother, Brad. Their parents are Carol and Charlton B. Daniel, Jr. (who died of cancer in 2008). Cynthia was named Homecoming Queen of her high school.

At age 11, the girls began modelling and were signed to the Ford Agency, and appeared in YM and Sassy. They also appeared in ads for Doublemint gum as the Doublemint Twins.

Career
Both twins made their television acting debut in a 1987 episode of The New Leave It to Beaver. In 1994, Daniel won the role of Elizabeth Wakefield in the television series Sweet Valley High, based on the book series by Francine Pascal (sister Brittany played Elizabeth's twin, Jessica Wakefield). During Sweet Valley High's run, the girls made their film debut in the 1995 drama The Basketball Diaries.

After Sweet Valley High was canceled in 1997, Daniel retired from acting and became a photographer. She has since made only one acting appearance, in a 2002 episode of That 80s Show, which also starred twin sister Brittany. In 2022, she and Brittany starred in the 2022 remake of Cheaper by the Dozen, marking her first acting role since 2002.

Personal life
Daniel has two sons, Ryland and Colt and daughter, Steely Rose, with her husband, actor Cole Hauser

Filmography

Awards

References

External links
Five Arrows Photography

Actresses from Florida
American child actresses
American film actresses
American television actresses
Gainesville High School (Florida) alumni
Identical twin actresses
Living people
Actresses from Gainesville, Florida
American twins
20th-century American actresses
21st-century American actresses
Female models from Florida
Photographers from Florida
Warner family
21st-century American women photographers
21st-century American photographers
Year of birth missing (living people)